Scott Brennan is an Australian actor and comedian. He is best known for his work on the Australian television program skitHOUSE. 

In 1990, he went to University of Melbourne to complete B. Ed (Sec) Arts.
He has been a regular performer at the Melbourne International Comedy Festival since 1999. Past shows include Spontaneous Broadway, Life - Get it up ya (which was also performed at the Edinburgh Fringe), Code Beige, Glen Bush; Teenage Superstar (for which he received a Moosehead grant) and Very Very Scary. In 2006, he joined the cast of the popular late night sketch comedy show Comedy Inc - The Late Shift, airing in Australia on the Nine Network. He also appeared on Foxtel's comedy show Stand Up Australia, where he performed a comedy routine on the fact that he is gay. In 2006 he also appeared as Dylan in the gay-science-fiction-fan-club short comedy film Outland. His other television credits include The Edge of the Bush, Upper Middle Bogan, Lowdown (Series 1 and 2), Judith Lucy's Spiritual Journey, Bogan Pride, Spicks and Specks, Rove Live, The Secret Life of Us, Blue Heelers, Stingers, and Welcher & Welcher. He has written for numerous television including Prank Patrol (ABC) and The Project (Network Ten).

In 2014, he co-founded production company "Mashup Pictures", through which he has written, directed and produced a number of projects. He co-produced series 1 and 2 of Housemates - a documentary series for ABC. He also wrote and directed Horror Housemates - a short form series for ABC iview. Most recently he created What could go wrong?, a comedy/doco series for ABC iview. During the lead up to the Australian Marriage Equality postal vote, he created a series of Sock Puppet Amateur Musicals on the debate (YouTube). Other project with the company include the short documentary Life and Death in Vientiane and Busker Stories. He regularly appears as a podcaster on Talking Poofy.

He has spent many years acting as a mentor and director for young comedians through the Comedy Festival's "LolSquad" program.

He is a member of the cult comedy trio "Granny Bingo", who perform sellout shows monthly, as well as touring festivals. In 2017, their Melbourne Comedy Festival show A visit with Nan in a caravan won the Golden Gibbo Award.

Brennan is also an active voice over artist, appearing in commercials for Hungry Jack's and Coles Supermarkets.

From July 2009, he appeared in the Australian soap opera Neighbours as Josh Burns, a local newspaper paper editor.

He is a massive fan of David Bowie.

References

External links
 
 Outland biography
https://www.mashuppictures.com/

Living people
RMITV alumni
Australian male comedians
Australian male television actors
Australian male voice actors
Australian gay actors
Gay musicians
Gay comedians
Year of birth missing (living people)
Australian LGBT comedians